NWRC serves the Ministry of Water Resources and Irrigation (Egypt) (MWRI) to advance and expedite the implementation of the national water policy. As a MWRI research and development arm, NWRC coordinates and conducts basic and applied research to identify, characterize, and quantify water-related problems in Egypt. For these problems NWRC is mandated to provide innovative solutions and communicate them to the end users; therefore, enhance research uptake. Its role as a national organization goes beyond the MWRI; it assists the other ministries as well as the private sector facing water related problems through facilitated access to interdisciplinary expertise.

NWRC's organization consists of 12 research institutes; basically tackling the following water resources related fields: Irrigation and Drainage, Hydraulics, Hydraulic Structures and Machinery, Surface and Groundwater Hydrology, Sediment Transport, Water Quality and Pollution Control, Coastal Protection and Lake/Shore Environment, Climate Change and Geo-Measurements Analysis, Water Socio-Economics.

Water Management Research Institute (WMRI)

Research areas 
 Irrigation Scheduling
 Optimal agriculture water allocation and distribution
 Socioeconomic impact of irrigation systems
 Assessment of performance indicators of irrigation schemes
 Matthew Hatem

Drainage Research Institute (DRI)

Research areas 
 Functional design criteria of tile drainage network
 Testing and evaluating new technologies and materials utilized in field drainage networks
 Socioeconomic impacts of field drainage networks
 Development of guidelines for the reuse of marginal water in agriculture
 Improvement of open drains self-purification capacity

Water Resources Research Institute (WRRI)

The Institute covers the research areas of:
 Hydrologic analysis of Wadi Systems and flash floods
 Optimal design criteria for flash flood control structures and drainage networks
 Impacts of Nile socioeconomic development on inflow to Lake Nasser
 Optimal National Water Resources development strategy

See also
Water resources management in modern Egypt
 Water supply and sanitation in Egypt

References

1975 establishments in Egypt
Environmental research institutes
Water supply and sanitation in Egypt
Research institutes in Egypt
Government agencies of Egypt